Lake Ciecere is a lake in the southern part of Latvia, near the town of Brocēni in Saldus Municipality, Latvia. The lake has the status of a nature reserve.

Geography 
The area of the lake is 276.8 hectares.  The lake is stretched from north to south, its length is 9.5 km, and its maximum width is 0.4 km.
It is a proglacial lake located in a furrow and is the most expressive example of this type of lake in Latvia. In some places lake is reminiscent of a river. Bearing - sandy, muddy. Shores in places cliffs. One large island is Oak Island, its area is 14 hectares. From 1923 to 1977 this island had the status of a natural monument, and from 1977-to 1999 it was a botanical reserve.  
The rivers Dunupe and Mazupe flow into the lake, and the river Ciecere flows out. 

Previously, it was believed that lake has a maximum depth of 50 m, but measurements carried out in 2000 showed that the lake is no deeper than 22 m.

Fauna 
There are 7 species of fish in the lake, including Common carp, Northern pike, European eel, Zander.

References

External links 

Ciecere
Venta River basin
Proglacial lakes
Saldus Municipality
Courland